Okinawa 4th district is a constituency of the House of Representatives in the Diet of Japan (national legislature). It is located in Okinawa Prefecture and encompasses the cities of Miyakojima, Ishigaki, Itoman, Tomigusuku, Nanjō, the village of Tarama, Yaeyama District and parts of Shimajiri District (Haebaru, Yaese and Yonabaru). The district was formed after the 2002 national electoral district review assigned Okinawa an extra district. Constituency cities and towns in the 1st and 2nd district were reassigned to form the 4th district. As of 2016, 286,832 eligible voters were registered in the district.

The district is currently represented by Kōsaburō Nishime of the Liberal Democratic Party.

List of representatives

Election results 

 
 '

References 

Districts of the House of Representatives (Japan)